Hungus may refer to:
A variant form of the name Ungus
A fictional creature in Infocom's text adventure Beyond Zork
Karl Hungus, a minor character in The Big Lebowski
A nonsensical word indicating frustration/happiness.